Anchovies is a 3-track EP by English folk musician David Thomas Broughton.

Track listing 

"Anchovies" – 9:22
"The Window" – 3:17
"Liberazione" – 5:03

Weblink

Reference 

David Thomas Broughton albums
2005 EPs
Folk EPs